Thomas Hurley may refer to:

Tom Hurley (trade unionist) (died 1933), British politician and trade union leader
Thomas Hurley (ice hockey) (born 1944), American ice hockey player
Tom Hurley, character in A Catered Affair
Thomas Hurly of the Hurly baronets
Tommy Hurley, see 2009 Toronto Rock season

See also